The 2000 WNBA season was the third season for the Washington Mystics. The team clinched their first WNBA Playoff berth, eventually losing in a sweep to the New York Liberty.

Offseason
Nyree Roberts and Rita Williams were both tabbed by the Indiana Fever in the 2000 WNBA Expansion Draft.

WNBA Draft

Trades

Regular season

Season standings

Season schedule

Playoffs

Player stats

References

Washington Mystics seasons
Washington
Washington Mystics